The Saint Croix National Scenic Riverway is a federally protected system of riverways located in eastern Minnesota and northwestern Wisconsin.  It protects  of river, including the St. Croix River (on the Wisconsin/Minnesota border), and the Namekagon River (in Wisconsin), as well as adjacent land along the rivers.  The St. Croix National Scenic Riverway is one of the original eight National Wild and Scenic Rivers, largely as a result of legislation by senators Walter Mondale of Minnesota and Gaylord Nelson of Wisconsin.  The largest scenic riverway east of the Mississippi River, it lies within parts of eight counties in Wisconsin: Bayfield, Burnett, Douglas, Pierce, Polk, St. Croix, Sawyer, and Washburn; and three in Minnesota: Chisago, Pine, and Washington.

Activities 
The upper St. Croix is a nationally renowned smallmouth bass fishery. Other fish species present in the riverway include walleye, northern pike, sturgeon, muskellunge, and catfish. The Namekagon River upstream of Hayward, Wisconsin is well known for its brown and brook trout fishing.

Besides fishing, the riverway is a popular destination for canoeing, boating, camping, tubing, and hunting. Camping is provided at dozens of National Park Service-designated sites, at state parks along the river, and, in certain sections, anywhere users wish to camp.  The riverway also includes numerous hiking trails, some of which are designated in winter for cross-country skiing.

Management 
The riverway is managed overall by the National Park Service.  The riverway headquarters and main visitor center are located in St. Croix Falls, Wisconsin, with an additional visitor center in Trego, Wisconsin operated during the summer. Large areas along both sides of the river are also managed by state agencies and include state parks and state forests.

Parks and public lands 
 Saint Croix State Forest, MN
 Governor Knowles State Forest, WI
 Saint Croix State Park, MN
 Chengwatana State Forest, MN
 Wild River State Park, MN
 Interstate Park, MN & WI
 William O'Brien State Park, MN
 St. Croix Boom Site, MN
 Afton State Park, MN
 Kinnickinnic State Park, WI
 St. Croix Bluffs Regional Park, MN

See also 
 St. Croix River (Wisconsin-Minnesota)
 Namekagon River

External links
 Saint Croix National Scenic Riverway website

1968 establishments in Minnesota
1968 establishments in Wisconsin
Protected areas established in 1968
Protected areas of Bayfield County, Wisconsin
Protected areas of Burnett County, Wisconsin
Protected areas of Douglas County, Wisconsin
Protected areas of Pierce County, Wisconsin
Protected areas of Polk County, Wisconsin
Protected areas of St. Croix County, Wisconsin
Protected areas of Sawyer County, Wisconsin
Protected areas of Washburn County, Wisconsin
Protected areas of Chisago County, Minnesota
Protected areas of Pine County, Minnesota
Protected areas of Washington County, Minnesota
National Park Service areas in Minnesota
National Park Service areas in Wisconsin
Wild and Scenic Rivers of the United States